Tom Wood may refer to:

 Tom Wood (actor) (born 1963), American film and television actor, birth name: Thomas Mills Wood
 Tom Wood (photographer) (born 1951), Irish photographer
 Tom Wood (rugby union) (born 1986), English rugby union player
 Tom Wood (visual effects), visual effects supervisor
 Tom Wood (author), British author of thriller novels
 Tom Wood (ice hockey) (1927–2015), Canadian ice hockey player
 Tom Wood (Derbyshire cricketer)

See also
 Thomas Wood (disambiguation)
 Thomas Woods (disambiguation)